The Miravci railway station serves the village of Miravci, North Macedonia. The two-storey station building is located outside Miravci, along the local road leading to village. Regional and domestic trains pass through the railway station on the Skopje - Gevgelija rail line.

History 
The railway to Miravci was built in 1872, when the village was connected to Thessaloniki. The railway was later extended (in several phases) to Skopje. 

A rockfall closed the rail line between the crossroads at Klisura and the station in April 2020 for about 14 hours in total.

Photos

References 

Railway stations in North Macedonia